France–Philippines relations are the foreign relations between France and the Philippines. In 1947, France and the Philippines signed a Treaty of Amity which established diplomatic relations with the two countries.

History

Relations between France and the Philippines had its roots since the Age of Exploration. When the Spanish expedition under Magellan reached the Philippines, 15 Frenchmen were among its crew. This includes Jean Petit of Angers, Lieutenant of Trinidad and Bernard Calmette, chaplain of San Antonio.

French missionaries also contributed to the spread of Christianity in the Philippines. The first Diocesan seminary in the Philippines, the seminary of St. Clement in Manila, was set up with the aid of French Monsignor Charles-Thomas Maillard de Tournon in 1704. French traders, technicians, soldiers, and officers and crews under the Manila galleon trade also came to the Philippines. The French recognized the potentials of the Philippines in the trading sector by the 17th century. France discovered the potential use of abaca in the manufacture of naval supplies, particularly ropes. Despite the Spanish colonial government's restrictions of  against foreign trade, French and other foreign traders were already in Manila before it was formally opened for foreign trade. Paris fashion became the standard in Manila. Foreign traders imported French products such as stockings, muslin and linen cloth, umbrellas, gloves and coats in the Philippines while the Filipinos exported most of its indigo to France.

During the war between the United States of America and the British called the War of 1812, of which, France supported the Americans; the French pirate Jean Lafitte allied with Filipinos who had escaped slavery from the Manila Galleons and were living in New Orleans. They joined the war against the British Empire. The Filipinos played a decisive role in securing the American victory in the Battle of New Orleans, firing barrage after barrage of well-aimed artillery fire.

In  1815, during the French conquest of Indochina, the French requested the assistance of Spain, which promptly sent soldiers of Spanish, Mexican, and Filipino origin living in the Philippines, to assist France in conquering the Vietnamese city of Saigon.

France became the first country to establish a consul in Spanish Philippines, followed by Belgium, the United States and finally Great Britain  in November 1844. France established its consul in Manila in March 1824.

Upon the opening of the Suez Canal, relations between the Philippines and European countries, including France, became more significant. Some rich and intellectual Filipinos came to France, which includes Jose Rizal, Felix Hidalgo and Juan Luna. French congregations founded colleges in the Philippines, among these colleges were the Assumption College, Saint Paul College, Notre Dame, and De La Salle University. French Liberalism also found its way to the Philippines which influenced the Filipino colonial government opposition, the reformists and the revolutionaries. The ideals of the French Revolution inspired the Philippine Revolution as the Constitution of the First Philippine Republic was based on the Second Constitution of France's First Republic.

During the centennial of the French Revolution in 1889, José Rizal sought to organize a conference called the Association Internationale des Philippinistes which was to be launched with Ferdinand Blumentritt, the President and Edmond Plauchut, the Vice President.  The French also permitted Rizal to live in exile in France where he wrote the books Noli Me Tangere and El Filibusterismo.

The revolutionaries of the Philippines sought support from France. In January 1897, the Philippine Commission in Hong Kong sent a petition to M. Henry Hannoteaux, Minister of Foreign Affairs, enumerating 50 points concerning the Philippine grievance against Spain and calling for France's assistance. In 1898, Emilio Aguinaldo also sent his delegate to Paris for the negotiation of an agreement, which concerned the fate of the Philippines in the aftermath of the Spanish–American War. Lastly, Filipino residents in Paris, urged by the Philippine government in exile in Hong Kong, made a commission calling for the recognition of the Republic. The commission was led by Pedro Roxas and Juan Luna.

However the Filipino revolutionaries failed to garner French support. France remained neutral and distanced itself from the Filipino revolutionaries as France respected Spain's sovereignty over the Philippines as a fellow colonial power.

Diplomatic relations between France and the Philippines was officially established on June 26, 1947, with the signing of the Treaty of Amity.

Economic relations
France is the Philippines' fourth largest trading partner in the European Union after Germany, The Netherlands and the United Kingdom, trade reached $2.39 billion as of October 2014. This represented an increase of 24% from the same period in 2013.

High level visits
In 2015, French President François Hollande made a two-day state visit to the Philippines.

Filipinos in France

More than 200,000 Filipino currently residing in France, half of them live illegally. 80% of Filipinos in France have lived in the nation for less than seven years, and 95% have lived in France for less than 15 years. Paris is home to a small Filipino community.

See also 
 Foreign relations of France
 Foreign relations of the Philippines

References

External links
 Embassy of France, Manila
 Embassy of the Philippines, Paris

 
Philippines
Bilateral relations of the Philippines